Albany Township may refer to:

Albany Township, Nevada County, Arkansas
Albany Township, Whiteside County, Illinois
Albany Township, Stearns County, Minnesota
Albany Township, Harlan County, Nebraska
Albany Township, Berks County, Pennsylvania
Albany Township, Bradford County, Pennsylvania

Township name disambiguation pages